Fulwood Barracks is a military installation at Fulwood in Preston, Lancashire, England.

History
The barracks were built between 1842 and 1848 as a base, initially at least, for the 2nd Battalion 60th Rifles following the chartist riots. In 1861 an unfortunate incident took place when Private Patrick McCaffery shot both the Commanding Officer and the Adjutant of the base: he was hanged for the offence.

In 1873 a system of recruiting areas based on counties was instituted under the Cardwell Reforms and the barracks became the depot for the 47th (Lancashire) Regiment of Foot and the 81st Regiment of Foot (Loyal Lincoln Volunteers). Following the Childers Reforms, the 47th and 81st Regiments amalgamated as the Loyal North Lancashire Regiment with its depot at the barracks in 1881.

The barracks also served as the depot of the East Lancashire Regiment from 1898, when the regiment re-located from Burnley Barracks, until 1939. The Loyal North Lancashire Regiment and the East Lancashire Regiment both returned to the barracks shortly after the Second World War. The barracks, which went on to become the regional centre for infantry training as the Lancastrian Brigade Depot in 1960, became the depot of the Queen's Lancashire Regiment in 1970 as well as Headquarters North West District in 1977 and then the headquarters of 42 (North West) Brigade in 1991. The keep, and 15 other buildings and structures in the barracks, are Grade II listed buildings.

In November 2016 the Ministry of Defence announced that the site would close in 2022; however this was later put back to 2027, and once more to 2030.

Current units
Current units stationed at the barracks include:

British Army
Headquarters North West
Regimental Headquarters, Duke of Lancaster's Regiment

Community Cadet Forces
Headquarters, Lancashire Army Cadet Force
Fulwood Detachment, Lancashire Army Cadet Force

See also 

 Kimberley Barracks (Army Reserve barracks located in Preston, just south of Fulwood)

References

Installations of the British Army
Barracks in England
Buildings and structures in Preston
Grade II listed buildings in Lancashire
1842 establishments in England